Kamenik is a small dispersed settlement in the hills south of Šmarje pri Jelšah in eastern Slovenia. The area is part of the traditional region of Styria and is included in the Savinja Statistical Region.

References

External links
Kamenik at Geopedia

Populated places in the Municipality of Šmarje pri Jelšah